Jiří Pokorný (born 14 October 1956) is a retired cyclist from Czechoslovakia. He won a bronze medal in the 4000 m team pursuit at the 1980 Summer Olympics and 1981 World Championships and finished in fifth place at the 1976 Summer Olympics.

References

1956 births
Living people
Sportspeople from Brno
Czech male cyclists
Czechoslovak male cyclists
Olympic cyclists of Czechoslovakia
Cyclists at the 1976 Summer Olympics
Cyclists at the 1980 Summer Olympics
Olympic medalists in cycling
Olympic bronze medalists for Czechoslovakia
Medalists at the 1980 Summer Olympics